Shelley Peterson (née Matthews; born 1952) is a Canadian television and film actress and writer, best known as the star of the Canadian sitcoms Not My Department and Dog House. She is also an author of several novels, her most known book being Dancer.

Born in London, Ontario, she is married to former premier of Ontario, David Peterson, and her sister is Deb Matthews, former deputy premier of Ontario . One of her children is journalist and activist Benjamin Peterson.

Filmography

Film

Television

References

External links
 

1952 births
Canadian television actresses
Canadian film actresses
Living people
Spouses of Canadian politicians
Canadian women novelists
20th-century Canadian novelists
21st-century Canadian novelists
Actresses from London, Ontario
Writers from London, Ontario
20th-century Canadian women writers
21st-century Canadian women writers